Abaratha alida, the yellow spotted angle or Alida angle, is a butterfly belonging to the family Hesperiidae. It is found in India, Sri Lanka, Myanmar, Thailand, Vietnam, Laos, Hainan and southern China. It was first described by Lionel de Nicéville in 1891.

Subspecies
The following subspecies are recognised:

 Abaratha alida lanka (Evans, 1932) - Sri Lanka
 Abaratha alida vespa (Evans, 1949) - India
 Abaratha alida yerburyi (Evans, 1949) - Pakistan
 Abaratha alida alida de Nicéville, 1891 - Thailand, northern India, Myanmar, Laos and Vietnam

Description

References

Pyrginae
Butterflies of Indochina
Butterflies described in 1891